Duke Mu of Chen (born 672 BC, reigned 647 BC – died 632 BC) was the seventeenth ruler of the ancient Chinese state of Chen during the Spring and Autumn period. His ancestral surname was Gui, given name Kuan (款), and Mu (穆) was his posthumous name.

Prince Kuan was born in 672 BC to the favourite concubine of Duke Xuan of Chen. Duke Xuan's original heir apparent was Crown Prince Yukou, but after Kuan was born, he killed Yukou and made Kuan his new heir apparent. Yukou was close to Chen Wan, the son of Duke Li of Chen. Afraid that his life was also in danger, Chen Wan fled to the State of Qi where he established the Chen (later known as Tian) clan. The Chen clan of Qi would grow increasingly powerful over the centuries, and eventually usurped the Qi throne.

In 653 BC, Prince Kuan represented Chen at a conference at Ningmu in the State of Lu, and made an alliance with Duke Huan of Qi, Duke Xi of Lu, Duke Huan of Song, and Crown Prince Hua of Zheng. After the death of King Hui of Zhou, Prince Kuan attended another conference in early 652 BC to discuss the succession of the Zhou court.

Duke Xuan reigned for 45 years and died in 648 BC. Kuan succeeded his father as ruler of Chen, to be known as Duke Mu. Duke Mu reigned for 16 years and died in 632 BC. He was succeeded by his son Shuo, to be known as Duke Gong of Chen.

References

Bibliography

Monarchs of Chen (state)
7th-century BC Chinese monarchs
632 BC deaths
7th-century BC births